María Nieves Álvarez Costa (born 2 July 1962), known as María Álvarez or Nieves Álvarez, is a paralympic athlete from Spain competing mainly in category T34-35 100m events.

Álvarez competed as part of the Spanish team at the 1996 Summer Paralympics in Atlanta, there she competed in the 200m where she was disqualified in the heat, in the 100m she won the silver medal behind Caroline Innes of Great Britain.

Notes

References

External links 
 
 

1962 births
Living people
Spanish female sprinters
Paralympic athletes of Spain
Paralympic silver medalists for Spain
Paralympic medalists in athletics (track and field)
Athletes (track and field) at the 1996 Summer Paralympics
Medalists at the 1996 Summer Paralympics
20th-century Spanish women
21st-century Spanish women